Viking FM is an Independent Local Radio station based in Leeds, England, owned and operated by Bauer as part of the Hits Radio network. It broadcasts to the East Riding of Yorkshire and Northern Lincolnshire.

As of September 2022, the station has a weekly audience of 175,000 listeners according to RAJAR.

Technical

The station is transmitted from the High Hunsley transmitter on the Yorkshire Wolds, near North Cave, sharing the 200 ft tower with Capital Yorkshire and BBC Radio Humberside, as well as on the Bauer Humberside DAB multiplex from three transmitters, located at High Hunsley, Buckton Barn near Bridlington and Grimsby town centre.

It is also streamed over the Internet via Viking FM's website, making it accessible to listeners from across the United Kingdom. Worldwide webcasting is no longer possible, for licensing reasons.

History
During the application process for the licence, the station's working title was Humber Bridge Radio; however on 17 April 1984, it was launched as Viking Radio and broadcast on 102.7 FM and 1161 kHz AM (258m Medium Wave). The first on-air presenter was David Fewster and the first song played was Celebration by Kool & the Gang.  In spring 1986, the frequency was changed to 96.9 FM, with BBC Radio Humberside moving to 95.9 FM.

Viking was the first commercial radio station in the UK to introduce split programming so that it could broadcast rugby league commentary on Sunday afternoons without interrupting The Network Chart Show. The rugby was aired on MW with The Network Chart broadcast on FM. On 31 October 1988, Viking Radio split frequencies on a permanent basis and was transformed into Viking FM on 96.9 FM and Viking Gold on 1161 medium wave. The AM station later became Classic Gold, Classic Gold Radio, Great Yorkshire Gold, Great Yorkshire Radio, Magic 1161 and Viking 2 and finally Greatest Hits East Yorkshire until the transmitter was switched off on 26 April 2021.

In 1990, The Yorkshire Radio Network, which owned Viking as well as Radio Hallam, Pennine Radio (now known as Pulse 1) and Classic Gold, were bought by The Metro Radio Group. In 1996, the station was bought by EMAP and as a result of a group takeover in 2008, Viking is now owned by Bauer Media Group, as part of the Hits Radio network of radio stations.

In August 2019, Bauer announced Viking FM would cease broadcasting from its Hull studios and co-locate with sister station Hallam FM in Sheffield from Wednesday 2 October 2019 but that it would maintain a local presence in the form of local news, advertising and charity staff. Later, the station became co-located with Pulse 1 in Leeds.

Achievement

In 2005, the station won its first Gold Award at the Sony Radio Academy Awards for "Happy Hour"; a news investigation into binge drinking in the region. They won a Bronze award in 2006 for their series of programmes on subjects like ASBO's and street crime.

In 2005, Viking FM's Creative Team (who write and make the adverts) won a Vox Award for a Road Safety ad, in 2006 they won four Vox Awards (Best Campaign, Best Use of Music, Best Media Production and Other) and the London International Awards for Sound Design. In 2007 they achieved a finalist place at the New York Awards and won a United Nations Award for Peace and Human Rights.

Branding
The original logo depicted the station mascot "Eric the Viking", this was phased out in the late 1980s when the logo style was shared with its sister stations. This was later phased out and replaced by the Bauer City 'splash'; used by many stations on the network. In 2015, the logo was overhauled across the Bauer City network and Viking FM has now adopted the 'Your' logo, in line with branding changes to all Bauer City stations.

Viking's original package was produced by CBC Creative - further idents were made by Jam Creative Productions, Alfasound and Reelworld. Viking went through a stage starting in the late 1990s of only using voice over sweeper production produced in-house, however, in 2006 a new sung package was commissioned, produced by Wise Buddah.

Programming

Networked programming originates from Bauer's Manchester headquarters.

Local programming is currently produced and broadcast from Bauer's Leeds studios, weekdays 6-10am

News
The news operation is based at Bauer's offices in Hull and studios in Leeds for the most part and during peak times, with local news bulletins hourly from 6am-7pm on weekdays, and from 7am-1pm on weekends. Headlines are broadcast on the half hour during weekday breakfast and drivetime shows, alongside traffic bulletins.

National bulletins from Sky News Radio are carried overnight with bespoke networked bulletins on weekend afternoons, usually originating from Bauer's Leeds newsroom.

Notable past presenters

 Jon Culshaw (comedian)
 Stephanie Hirst (now with Hits Radio)
 Lucy Horobin (now with Heart Dance)
 JK & Joel
 Roger Kirk (deceased)
 Allan Lake
 Martin Lee (Former PD of Pennine Radio, also known as Cliff Osbourne - ex Radio Caroline, now Quasar Radio)
 Karen Petch (deceased)
 Steve Priestley (now with Greatest Hits Radio Yorkshire)
 Matthew Rudd (now with Absolute Radio 80s)
 Harriet Scott (now with Magic Radio)
 Tim Shaw
 Simon Logan

References

External links
 
 Viking FM - Public File
 History of local radio in Yorkshire. (Archived (Archived 19 October 2009)
 David's Transmitter World
 High Hunsley transmitter

Bauer Radio
Hits Radio
Mass media in Kingston upon Hull
Radio stations in Yorkshire
Radio stations established in 1984